Prosopodopsis is a genus of flies in the family Tachinidae.

Species
P. appendiculata (de Meijere, 1910)
P. orbitalis (Baranov, 1938)
P. ruficornis (Chao, 2002)

References

Exoristinae
Diptera of Asia
Tachinidae genera
Taxa named by Charles Henry Tyler Townsend